Wilmington is an unincorporated community in Hogan Township, Dearborn County, Indiana.

History
Wilmington was laid out in 1815. It was once the county seat.

A post office was established at Wilmington in 1817, and remained in operation until it was discontinued in 1907.

Geography

References

Unincorporated communities in Dearborn County, Indiana
Unincorporated communities in Indiana
Populated places established in 1815
1815 establishments in Indiana Territory